Gerald FitzJames FitzGerald was a sixteenth-century priest in Ireland: he was Dean of Lismore from 1564 until his deprivation in 1583.

References

Irish Anglicans
Deans of Lismore